Qanat Ebrahim (also Romanized as Qanāt Ebrāhīm) is a village in Sarchehan Rural District, Sarchehan District, Bavanat County, Fars Province, Iran. At the 2006 census, its population was 476, in 100 families.

References 

Populated places in Sarchehan County